The women's 5000 metres at the 2019 World Athletics Championships was held at the Khalifa International Stadium in Doha, Qatar, from 2 to 5 October 2019.

Records
Before the competition, the records were as follows:

The following records were established during the competition:

Schedule
The event schedule, in local time (UTC+3), was as follows:

Results

Heats
The first five in each heat (Q) and the next five fastest (q) qualified for the final.

Final
The final was started on 5 October at 21:25.

References

5000
5000 metres at the World Athletics Championships